Xu Pingjun (89? BC – 1 March 71 BC), formally Empress Gong'ai (literally, the Respectful and Lamentable Empress) and sometimes (but not at all times) Empress Xiaoxuan, was an empress of the Chinese Western Han dynasty. She was the first wife of Emperor Xuan. She was murdered by poisoning by Huo Guang's wife Xian. She was also the mother of Emperor Yuan.

Family background 
Xu Pingjun was born into a family that had some minor privileges but had also suffered under the reign of Emperor Wu.  It is not known exactly when she was born, but probably circa 89 BC. Her father Xu Guanghan (許廣漢) was an assistant to the Prince of Changyi when young, and later became an imperial attendant. Later, while accompanying Emperor Wu on a trip, he accidentally took the saddle of another attendant and was charged with theft; his sentence was castration. After castration, he became a eunuch at court, and served as a minor official.

Marriage to then-commoner Liu Bingyi 
Xu Pingjun's future husband Liu Bingyi was the only surviving descendant of Liu Ju, Emperor Wu's crown prince who was forced into a failed rebellion in 91 BC when he was still an infant.  He was spared, but was made a commoner and, as an orphan, he had to survive on the largess of others, including his grandfather's old subordinate Zhang He (張賀), who was also castrated by Emperor Wu as punishment for having been Crown Prince Ju's subordinate, and who became a chief eunuch.

Around 76 BC, Zhang wanted to marry his granddaughter to Bingyi, but his brother Zhang Anshi (張安世), then an important official, opposed this, fearing that it would bring trouble.  Zhang, instead, invited Xu Guanghan, a subordinate to him, to dinner and persuaded him to marry his daughter, Pingjun.  When Xu's wife heard this, she became extremely angry and refused, but because Zhang was Xu's superior, Xu did not dare to renege on the promise, and Bingyi and Pingjun were married, in a ceremony entirely paid by Zhang (because Bingyi could not afford to).  Zhang also paid the bride price.  After their marriage, Bingyi depended on his wife's family for support.  In 75 BC, Pingjun bore him a son, Liu Shi.

As empress 
In 75 BC, an unexpected development occurred.  After the death of Bingyi's granduncle, Emperor Zhao, the regent Huo Guang, having been dissatisfied with his initial selection of Prince He of Changyi as the new Emperor, deposed Prince He and offered the throne to the commoner Bingyi instead.  Bingyi accepted and took the throne as Emperor Xuan.

After her husband became emperor, Pingjun was initially created an imperial consort.  When it came time to create an empress, the officials largely wanted Emperor Xuan to marry Huo Guang's daughter Huo Chengjun and create her empress. Emperor Xuan did not explicitly reject this proposal, but issued an order to seek out the sword that he owned as a commoner. Getting the hint, the officials recommended Consort Xu as empress, and she was created as such on 31 December 74 BC. He initially wanted to create his father-in-law Xu Guanghan a marquess, but Huo opposed this, reasoning a eunuch who had suffered castration as a punishment should not be made a marquess. Instead, Xu was given the title of Lord of Changcheng (昌成君).

As empress, Empress Xu was known for her humility and thriftiness.  She was also known for devotion to Grand Empress Dowager Shangguan, often meeting her for meals.

Death 

Huo Guang's wife, Lady Xian, would not be denied her wish of making her daughter an empress.  In 71 BC, Empress Xu was pregnant when Lady Xian came up with a plot. She bribed Empress Xu's female physician Chunyu Yan (淳于衍), under guise of giving Empress Xu medicine after she gave birth, to poison her. Chunyu did so (with aconitum), and Empress Xu died shortly after she gave birth. Her doctors were initially arrested to investigate whether they cared for the empress properly. Lady Xian, alarmed, informed Huo Guang what had actually happened, and Huo, not having the heart to turn in his wife, instead signed Chunyu's release.  (It is not known what happened to Empress Xu's newborn child, but since Chinese historical sources at that time did not pay much attention to children who die young, presumably the child died early.)

Empress Xu was buried with full imperial honours near, but not with, her husband, whose third wife Empress Wang was later buried with him.  Her son Prince Shi would later become crown prince and later Emperor Yuan after surviving attempts on his life by Empress Xu's successor, Empress Huo. The Huo clan would be destroyed in 66 BC.

References 

 Book of Han, vol. 97, part 1.
 Zizhi Tongjian, vol. 24.

71 BC deaths
Han dynasty empresses
1st-century BC Chinese women
1st-century BC Chinese people
Deaths by poisoning
Year of birth unknown
Deaths_in_childbirth